Thomas Holliday Hicks (1798–1865) was a U.S. Senator from Maryland from 1862 to 1865. Senator Hicks may also refer to:

Clayton Hicks (1919–1999), Wisconsin State Senate
Edwin Hicks (1830–1902), New York State Senate
Larry S. Hicks (fl. 2010s), member of the Wyoming Senate
Xenophon Hicks (1872–1952), Tennessee State Senate